Könchogsum Lhakhang, also known as Tsilung, is a Buddhist monastery in central Bhutan.

History
According to Saint Pema Lingpa, the temple was founded as far back as the 8th century. In 1039, Bonpo Dragtshel, a tertön, discovered texts which had been buried by Padmasambhava in this location. According to a legend, the king of the water deities was said to have risen out of the lake beneath the temple and offered Dragtshel a stone pillar and scroll. This concept of a lake beneath the monastery is also reiterated in another legend in which Pema Lingpa is said to have discovered the subterranean lake. The entrance was concealed with a stone and stands until today, in the courtyard of the monastery.

In February 2010, Könchogsum Lhakhang was severely damaged by fire and has since been rebuilt. The new temple and monastery was consecrated in November 2014.

Architecture
The temple contains a statue of Vairocana in its main sanctuary and statues of Padmasambhava, Avalokiteśvara, and paintings of Pema Lingpa and Longchenpa.

Further reading
 Konchogsum Lhakhang - Bhutan Cultural Atlas
 Kenchosum Monastery - Pema Lingpa Foundation

Notes

Bibliography

Buddhist monasteries in Bhutan
Nyingma monasteries and temples
8th-century establishments in Asia
Tibetan Buddhism in Bhutan